Ignácz Berecz (March 21, 1912 – December 29, 1997) was a Hungarian cross-country skier who competed in the 1950s. He finished 31st in the 50 km event at the 1952 Winter Olympics in Oslo.

He died in Miskolc.

External links
Olympic 50 km cross country skiing results: 1948-64

1912 births
1997 deaths
Olympic cross-country skiers of Hungary
Cross-country skiers at the 1952 Winter Olympics
Hungarian male cross-country skiers